is a railway station in Ikuno-ku, Osaka, Japan, operated by the Osaka Metro.

Lines

Station layout
The station is located beneath National Route 479. It consists of an island platform serving two tracks on the second basement level.

Platforms

Ikuno-ku, Osaka
Osaka Metro stations
Railway stations in Osaka
Railway stations in Japan opened in 1981